Ardrossan is one of the nine wards used to elect members of the North Ayrshire council. Created as Ardrossan and Arran in 2007, covering the Isle of Arran in the Firth of Clyde and the coastal town of Ardrossan (the two connected by a ferry route), it originally elected four councillors. A national boundary review prior to the 2017 local elections saw no difference in territory but one fewer seat.

After the introduction of the Islands (Scotland) Act 2018, North Ayrshire's wards were re-organised for the 2022 election: a new single-member ward for Arran was created to better represent the specific needs of the small insular community of approximately 4,500; the existing ward had its name shortened to Ardrossan and still retained three councillors, although the extra territory on the mainland assigned in the re-organisation was largely farmland barely affected the population.

Councillors

Election Results

2022 Election
2022 North Ayrshire Council election

Source:

2017 Election
2017 North Ayrshire Council election

2012 Election
2012 North Ayrshire Council election

2007 Election
2007 North Ayrshire Council election

References

Wards of North Ayrshire
Ardrossan−Saltcoats−Stevenston